Chlorophorus flavopubescens is a species of beetle in the family Cerambycidae. It was described by Hayashi in 1968.

References

Clytini
Beetles described in 1968